John Bradley Lamb (December 23, 1935 – August 17, 2021) was a Canadian football player who played for the Edmonton Eskimos and Calgary Stampeders. He won the Grey Cup with the Eskimos in 1955. He was born in Edmonton, but played junior football in Calgary and in Kitchener with the Kitchener-Waterloo Dutchmen. Lamb also played ice hockey for the Maple Leaf Athletic Club.

References

1935 births
2021 deaths
Calgary Stampeders players
Edmonton Elks players
Canadian football people from Edmonton
Players of Canadian football from Alberta